Schizopelma is a genus of tarantulas that was first described by Frederick Octavius Pickard-Cambridge in 1897.  it contains two species, found in Central America and Mexico: S. bicarinatum and S. juxtantricola.

See also
 List of Theraphosidae species

References

Theraphosidae genera
Spiders of Central America
Spiders of Mexico
Taxa named by Frederick Octavius Pickard-Cambridge
Theraphosidae